Samir Habashneh (born 1951) is the Minister of State and Minister of Agriculture for Jordan. He is a former Minister of the Interior.

Born in 1951, Habashneh earned his BSc in agricultural engineering from Baghdad University in 1974. He worked in the Agricultural Cooperative Society and then as a consultant at the Ministry of Youth in 1992. In 1993, he became a deputy in Parliament, representing the southern Governorate of Karak. He was appointed Minister of Culture in 1995 and became a senator in 2001. He was a member of the Jordan First Committee and a member in the Jordanian Parties Committee. He was the Minister of the Interior until April 2005., serving since 9 February 2011.

See also
Cabinet of Jordan

References

External links
Ministry of Agriculture official site
Prime Ministry of Jordan website

Members of the House of Representatives (Jordan)
Members of the Senate of Jordan
1951 births
Living people
Culture ministers of Jordan
University of Baghdad alumni
Government ministers of Jordan
Agriculture ministers of Jordan
State ministers of Jordan
Sports ministers of Jordan
Interior ministers of Jordan
Jordanian people of Palestinian descent